Niflumic acid is a drug used for joint and muscular pain. It is categorized as an inhibitor of cyclooxygenase-2. In experimental biology, it has been employed to inhibit chloride channels. It has also been reported to act on GABA-A and NMDA channels and to block T-type calcium channels.

References 

Aminopyridines
Anilines
Trifluoromethyl compounds
Calcium channel blockers
GABAA receptor positive allosteric modulators
NMDA receptor antagonists
Aromatic acids
Chloride channel blockers